Zofia Jaroszewska (25 September 1902 – 25 September 1985) was a Polish film actress.

Selected filmography
 Jealousy (1922)
 Dvanáct křesel (1933)
 The Maids of Wilko (1979)

References

External links

1902 births
1985 deaths
People from Irbit
People from Irbitsky Uyezd
People from the Russian Empire of Polish descent
Polish film actresses
Polish silent film actresses
Polish stage actresses
Polish theatre directors
20th-century Polish actresses
Burials at Salwator Cemetery